is a Japanese manga written by Buronson and illustrated by Kentaro Miura. It was published in Hakusensha's seinen manga magazine Young Animal in 1992. In North America, it was licensed in English by Dark Horse Comics.

Plot
A yakuza, in love with a TV reporter, comes to Barcelona, Spain, where she is making a report on foreigners' idea of the Japanese people, and how Japanese people see themselves; during her speech, she draws a parallel between modern-day Japan and ancient Carthage, saying that the Carthaginians were wiped out by the Romans because of the same attitude Japanese people have nowadays, and because economic superiority brings war, and in the end loses to military strength. Suddenly, there is an earthquake, and the ghosts of the Carthaginians bring the group (the two yakuza, the TV reporter and some university students) to the future, when the sea level has increased and all the islands which compose the Japanese archipelago have been submerged. The Japanese people have thus immigrated to other countries, being scattered around the world, and in particular in Europe, where, after the cataclysm, a dictatorship has been established, and they have become slaves and bandits. Japan is long gone, and Japanese people are lost and oppressed; but among the newcomers, desperate of what they learn, the yakuza, who mostly wishes to protect the woman he dearly loves, has a dream: Japan can be refounded, if the Japanese people come together to fight for it.

Publication
Japan, written by Buronson and illustrated by Kentaro Miura, was serialized in Hakusensha's seinen manga magazine Young Animal in 1992. Hakusensha collected its chapters in a single tankōbon volume, released on November 27, 1992. A bunkoban edition volume was released on June 12, 1998. In North America, the manga was licensed by Dark Horse Comics. The volume was published on August 24, 2005.

Reception
In Manga: The Complete Guide, author Jason Thompson gave Japan two out of four stars and wrote: "This perhaps entertainingly nationalist fantasy is 50 percent fighting and 50 percent meaningless ruminations like 'What the hell does it mean to be Japanese anyway?' Kentaro Miura's bold action artwork gives a palpable sense of weight and impact".

References

External links

1992 manga
Adventure anime and manga
Dark Horse Comics titles
Hakusensha manga
Post-apocalyptic anime and manga
Seinen manga
Yakuza in anime and manga
Yoshiyuki Okamura
Works about nationalism